Events in the year 2019 in Paraguay.

Incumbents
 President: Mario Abdo Benítez 
 Vice President: Hugo Velázquez Moreno

Events

Sports
21 November to 1 December (scheduled) – Paraguay will host the 2019 FIFA Beach Soccer World Cup, to be held in the city of Asunción

Deaths

17 March – Víctor Genes, footballer (b. 1961).

27 March – Jan Kobylański, union leader and stamp printer (b. 1923).

7 April – Luis Fernando Páez, footballer (b. 1989).

References

 
2010s in Paraguay
Years of the 21st century in Paraguay
Paraguay
Paraguay